The Northumberland Senior Cup is an annual rugby union competition held between the clubs of the Northumberland RFU which was first played in 1882.  It is the senior county cup for the Northumberland Rugby Union, which includes Newcastle upon Tyne, North Tyneside, and Northumberland. The current holders are Alnwick who defeated Novocastrians in the 2022 cup final. Most finals were held at the Northumberland County Ground from 1912 up until 1988; before and after the County Ground's existence Senior Cup Finals have been played at various venues in the county.

The Senior Cup is currently the premier county cup competition for club sides affiliated to the Northumberland Rugby Football Union typically based at level 5 (North Premier) and level 6 (North 1 East) of the English rugby union system, although the 2nd XV of Tynedale (who play in level 4 National League 2 North), Berwick (who play in the Scottish Regional League) and the two university's in Newcastle (who play in the BUCS) have taken part in the competition.  The format is as a knock-out cup with a quarter-final, semi-final and final, which is to be played at a neutral ground in April on Easter Saturday.

Past winners

Clubs now defunct*

By number of wins (clubs)

Northumberland Senior Plate

With the advent of professionalism, the gap between some clubs became too great in the county. In the 2001-2002 season the Northumberland Senior Plate was inaugurated as a competition for clubs knocked out of the first round of the Northumberland Senior Cup. Since then the competition has undergone various changes. The Plate is now competed for by all clubs, who are not in the top eight of Northumberland clubs, every season.

See also
 Northumberland RFU
 English rugby union system
 Rugby union in England

References

Rugby union cup competitions in England
Rugby union in Northumberland
Recurring sporting events established in 1882